Zabrežnik is a small dispersed settlement in the hills east of Selo in the Municipality of Žiri in the Upper Carniola region of Slovenia.

References

External links
Zabrežnik on Geopedia

Populated places in the Municipality of Žiri